Refuge de la Valmasque is a refuge in the Alps-Maritimes. It is located in the French National Parc Mercantour.

Mountain huts in the Alps
Mountain huts in France
Mercantour National Park